Johny Ruiz (born 11 June 1971) is a Colombian former professional racing cyclist. He won the Colombian National Road Race Championships in 1998.

References

External links
 

1971 births
Living people
Colombian male cyclists
Sportspeople from Bogotá